Minervini is an Italian surname. Notable people with the surname include:

Angela Minervini, 1960s Italian film actress
Gianni Minervini (producer), (born 1928), Italian actor and television and film producer
Gianni Minervini (swimmer), (born 1966), Italian Olympic swimmer
Girolamo Minervini, (1919–1980), Italian magistrate
Guglielmo Minervini, (1961–2016), Italian politician
Roberto Minervini, (born 1970), Italian film director, screenwriter, photographer, and music producer